The list of ship launches in 1865 includes a chronological list of some ships launched in 1865.


References 

Sources

1865
Ship launches